Everything I Own is the seventh studio album by Jamaican recording artist Ken Boothe. It was released in 1974 by Trojan Records. It is not to be confused with the three Ken Boothe compilation albums, Everything I Own (1997), Everything I Own: The Best of Ken Boothe (2003) and Everything I Own: The Definitive Collection (2007).

The most famous track from this album is the title track, "Everything I Own" (originally recorded by American band Bread), which was an international hit and became number one on the UK Singles Chart. "Crying Over You was similarly successful in the UK, reaching #11 on the UK Singles charts in 1974.

"Speak Softly Love" adapts the melody from The Godfather.

Track listing

Personnel
 Ken Boothe - Vocals
 Johnny Arthey & Tony King - Arrangement (All tracks except 1, 3, 6, 9)
 Franklyn Dunn - Bass (All tracks except 1, 3, 6, 9)
 Lloyd Parks - Bass (Tracks 1, 3, 6, 9)
 Federal Soul Givers - Brass (Tracks 1, 3, 6, 9)
 Ken Elliot - Clavinet & Synthesizer (All tracks except 1, 3, 6, 9)
 Maurice Ellis - Drums (All tracks except 1, 3, 6, 9)
 Paul Douglas a.k.a. Paul Williams - Drums (Tracks 1, 3, 6, 9)
 Sid Bucknor & Vic Keary - Engineer (All tracks except 1, 3, 6, 9)
 Buddy Davidson & George Raymond - Mixing Engineer (Tracks 1, 3, 6, 9)
 Locksley Gichie - Guitar (All tracks except 1, 3, 6, 9)
 Willie Lindo - Guitar (Tracks 1, 3, 6, 9)
 Carl Levy - Keyboards (All tracks except 1, 3, 6, 9)
 Lloyd Charmers - Producer, Organ, Piano & Percussion (Tracks 1, 3, 6, 9)
 The Cimarons & Webster Shrowder - Producer (All tracks except 1, 3, 6, 9)

References

1974 albums
Trojan Records albums